Jarasporn Bundasak (born March 1, 1993) is a Thai indoor volleyball player. She is a current member of the Thailand women's national volleyball team.

Career
Bundasak ranked in seventh place in the 2016 Club World Championship playing with Bangkok Glass.

She participated at the 2015 U23 World Championship, and 2016 World Grand Prix.

Clubs
  Nakhon Ratchasima (2010–2014)
  Bangkok Glass (2014–2018)
  Nakhon Ratchasima (2018–2019)
  Diamond Food (2019–2021)
  Denso Airybees (2021–)

Awards

Clubs
 2013–14 Thailand League –  Champion, with Nakhon Ratchasima
 2014–15 Thailand League –  Champion, with Bangkok Glass
 2015 Thai–Denmark Super League –  Champion, with Bangkok Glass
 2015–16 Thailand League –  Champion, with Bangkok Glass
 2016 Thai–Denmark Super League –  Champion, with Bangkok Glass
 2016 PSL Invitational Cup –  Co-champion, with Est Cola
 2016–17 Thailand League –  Runner-up, with Bangkok Glass
 2018–19 Thailand League –  Champion, with Nakhon Ratchasima
 2016 Asian Club Championship –  Bronze medal with Bangkok Glass

References

External links
 FIVB Biography
 Profile at Bangkok Glass

1993 births
Living people
Jarasporn Bundasak
Jarasporn Bundasak
Denso Airybees players
Thai expatriate sportspeople in Japan
Expatriate volleyball players in Japan
Universiade medalists in volleyball
Jarasporn Bundasak
Southeast Asian Games medalists in volleyball
Competitors at the 2015 Southeast Asian Games
Competitors at the 2017 Southeast Asian Games
Universiade bronze medalists for Thailand
Medalists at the 2013 Summer Universiade
Jarasporn Bundasak
Competitors at the 2021 Southeast Asian Games
Middle blockers